Legislative elections were held in Israel on 23 July 1984 to elect the eleventh Knesset. Voter turnout was 78.8%. The results saw the Alignment return to being the largest party in the Knesset, a status it had lost in 1977. However, the party could not form a government with any of the smaller parties, resulting in a national unity government with Likud, with both party leaders, Shimon Peres and Yitzhak Shamir, holding the post of Prime Minister for two years each.

Background

The ongoing South Lebanon conflict

Bus 300 affair

Parliamentary factions

The table below lists the parliamentary factions represented in the 10th Knesset.

Results

The Eleventh Knesset

Due to the stalemate produced by the elections, it was decided to form a national unity government, with the Alignment and Likud holding the leadership for two years each. The Alignment's Shimon Peres formed the twenty-first government on 13 September 1984. Alongside the Alignment and Likud, the coalition government included the National Religious Party, Agudat Yisrael, Shas, Morasha, Shinui and Ometz. Outside national unity governments formed during wartime (notably the government formed during the Six-Day War in the term of the sixth Knesset, which had 111 MKs), it was the largest-ever coalition in Israeli political history, with 97 MKs.

In accordance with the rotation agreement, Peres resigned in 1986 and Likud's Yitzhak Shamir formed the twenty-second government on 20 October 1986. Shinui left the coalition on 26 May 1987.

The eleventh Knesset also contained two controversial parties, Kach and the Progressive List for Peace (PLFP). Kach was a far-right party that advocated the expulsion of most Israeli Arabs, and although it had run in previous elections, it had not passed the electoral threshold. Ultimately the party was banned after a law was passed barring parties that incited racism. The attempts made to stop Kach from competing in the next elections also affected the PLFP, as the addition of section 7a to the Basic Law dealing with the Knesset ("Prevention of Participation of Candidates List") included the banning of parties that denied Israel's existence as a Jewish state:

A candidates' list shall not participate in elections to the Knesset if its objects or actions, expressly or by implication, include one of the following... negation of the existence of the State of Israel as the state of the Jewish people.

On this basis, the Central Elections Committee initially banned the PLFP from running for the 1988 elections, arguing that its policies promoted the scrapping of Israel as a Jewish state. However, the decision was eventually overturned by the Supreme Court of Israel, and the party was able to compete in the elections, winning one seat. Nevertheless, the law was not overturned, the Supreme Court merely deciding it was impossible to determine if "the real, central and active purpose [of the PFLP] is to bring about the elimination of the State of Israel as the state of the Jewish people", and attempts were made to ban the Israeli Arab parties Balad and Ta'al using the same law prior to the 2003 elections.

During the Knesset term eight MKs left the Alignment; five to establish Mapam (one of which, Muhammed Wattad, later defected from Mapam to Hadash), Abdulwahab Darawshe to establish the Arab Democratic Party, Yossi Sarid defected to Ratz and Yitzhak Artzi to Shinui. The Alignment also gained three MKs when Yahad merged into it.

Ometz and Tami merged into Likud. Mordechai Virshubski defected from Shinui to Ratz. Rafael Eitan broke away from Tehiya to establish Tzomet. Haim Drukman defected from Morasha to the National Religious Party. Shimon Ben-Shlomo broke away from Shas to sit as an independent.

See also
1984 Herut leadership election
1984 Israeli Labor Party leadership election

References

External links
Historical overview of the Eleventh Knesset Knesset website
Election results Knesset website

Israel
Legislative election
Legislative elections in Israel
Israel
Israel